Veng Sakhon (born 5 August 1960) was the Cambodian Minister of Agriculture, Forestry and Fisheries from April 2016 to October 2022.

References 

Living people
1960 births
21st-century Cambodian politicians
Agriculture ministers 
Government ministers of Cambodia
Members of the National Assembly (Cambodia) 
Cambodian politicians